Three ice hockey teams in Chilliwack, British Columbia have been called the Chilliwack Bruins. These include:

The Chilliwack Bruins (BCJHL), a junior "A" team in the British Columbia Junior Hockey League, from 1970 to 1976
 The Chilliwack Bruins (PJHL), a junior "A" team in the Pacific Junior A Hockey League from 1976 to 1978
 The Chilliwack Bruins (WHL), a major junior team in the Western Hockey League from 2006 to 2011.

de:Chilliwack Bruins